Pucho & His Latin Soul Brothers was a Latin jazz, soul jazz and R&B group formed in 1959 by timbales player Henry "Pucho" Brown. Of the many musicians that worked in his group, Chick Corea is among them. In 1973 he disbanded the group and focused more on traditional Latin music.

In the 1990s, his music received interest from the British Acid Jazz scene, and the re-formed Latin Soul Brothers perform today.

Discography
Tough! (Prestige, 1966)
Saffron And Soul (Prestige, 1966; reissued on BGP/Ace in 2012)
Shuckin' And Jivin'  (Prestige, 1967; reissued on BGP/Ace in 2012)
Big Stick (Prestige, 1967; reissued on BGP/Ace in 2012)
Heat! (Prestige, 1968; reissued on BGP/Ace in 1992)
Dateline (Prestige, 1969; reissued on BGP/Ace in 2012)
Jungle Fire! (Prestige, 1970; reissued on BGP/Ace in 1992)
Yaina (Right-On Records, 1971; reissued on CuBop/Ubiquity in 1996)
Super Freak (Zanzee Records, 1972; reissued on CuBop/Ubiquity in 1996)
Jungle Strut (Lexington/West 47th, 1993; reissued as Pucho's Descarga on ¡Andale! in 2014) - with Bernard Purdie, Melvin Sparks
Rip A Dip (Milestone, 1995)
Mucho Pucho (Timeless, 1997)
Groovin' High (Cannonball, 1997)
Caliente Con Soul! (CuBop/Ubiquity, 1999)
How'M I Doin'? (Cannonball, 2000)
The Hideout (Milestone, 2004)

Compilations
The Best Of Pucho & The Latin Soul Brothers With Jackie "Soul" Thompson (Prestige PR-7679, 1969) (compilation of three albums: Shuckin' And Jivin' , Big Stick, Heat!)
The Best Of Pucho & The Latin Soul Brothers (BGP/Ace, 1993) (compilation drawn from all 7 Pucho albums on Prestige)
Tough! (Prestige, 1994) (compilation of Tough! + Saffron And Soul)
The Best Of Pucho & His Latin Soul Brothers (Prestige, 1996) (compilation drawn from 5 different Pucho albums)
Cold Shoulder (Prestige, 2000) (compilation drawn from 4 different Pucho albums)

References

Prestige Records artists
MGM Records artists
Ubiquity Records artists
Soul-jazz musicians
Latin jazz musicians
American funk musical groups